"Castles of Sand" is a song recorded by American R&B singer Jermaine Jackson. It was released as the first and only single from his 1978 album, Frontiers, in March of that year.

The song was heavily sampled in the song "Somehow, Someway" by Jay-Z off his album, The Blueprint 2 (2002), which featured fellow rappers Scarface and Beanie Sigel produced by Just Blaze.

Charts

References

1978 songs
1978 singles
Jermaine Jackson songs
Motown singles